Ceratophyllus borealis , also known as the boreal flea, is an ectoparasite of birds. It is a black species found on ground-nesting birds such as pipits, wheatears and wagtails.

References 

Insects described in 1907
Ectoparasites
Parasites of birds
Ceratophyllidae